S5600 may refer to:

 Fujifilm FinePix S5200, a bridge digital camera made by Fujifilm, known in Europe as S5600;
 Samsung S5600, a touch-screen phone by Samsung;
 Samsung S5600v, a touch-screen phone by Samsung.